Bradford Academy is a Diocese of West Yorkshire sponsored all-through Academy in south-east Bradford. It has grown to approximately 1800 pupils.

Bradford Academy opened in September 2007.  In September 2010, Bradford Academy secured All-Through Academy status, with a 62-place nursery, primary provision for reception to Year 6 and over 500 students in Post 16.  Bradford Academy now has over 2,000 pupils ranging from ages 2 to 18.

Bradford Academy is sponsored by the Diocese of Bradford and together have developed Citizenship with Enterprise as the specialism of the Academy. Bradford Academy's ambition is for at least 60% of their students to gain five good GCSEs, ensuring they are in the top 5% of similar schools nationally.

History
It opened to its first pupils on 9 September 2007. It was officially opened in April 2008 by John Sentamu, the Archbishop of York.

Former schools
It is based on the site of Bradford Cathedral Community College which was a voluntary-aided school on Lister Avenue for ages 11–18. This was on the site of Fairfax Grammar School, opened in 1963 on Lister Avenue which became Fairfax School then Fairfax Community School. In the early 1970s it had around 1,100 boys and girls aged 13–18.

References

External links
 EduBase
 Former school
 Plan for the Academy in 2003

News items
 Academy officially opened in April 2008
 Academy plan in January 2004

Audio clips
 The Learning Curve October 2006

Schools in Bradford
Educational institutions established in 2007
Academies in the City of Bradford
Primary schools in the City of Bradford
Secondary schools in the City of Bradford
2007 establishments in England